Timothy Foster (May 14, 1720 – April 3, 1785) and his family were the first colonial settlers of Winthrop, Maine. He was a captain in the Massachusetts militia during the American Revolutionary War.

Early life

Timothy Foster was born on May 14, 1720, at Attleborough in Massachusetts Bay Colony—the ninth of thirteen children. His mother Margaret Ware (1685–1761) and his father John Foster (1680–1759) were born, respectively, in the Massachusetts Bay towns of Wrentham and Salem. John Foster was a blacksmith and an elected deputy to the Massachusetts General Court.

First settler of Winthrop, Maine

Timothy Foster acquired a large tract of forest and meadow in Pondtown Plantation, now known as Winthrop, Maine, in 1764. The land, which he purchased for £26 (equivalent to about US$5500 in 2022) from a traveling land speculator, was located on the western shore of Cobbosseecontee Lake. The following year, Foster and his wife Sibboleth and their ten children relocated from Attleborough to Pondtown, becoming the first pioneers to settle in the area. In 1766, Foster's 200-acre lot, designated as lot eight, was officially recorded in a colonial deed that required him to construct a house, cultivate and till at least five acres of land, and reside on the premises. The first frame house in Pondtown was constructed by the Fosters in 1769. The town of Winthrop was incorporated in 1771, with Foster being elected to its inaugural board of selectmen.

Military service
The town of Winthrop petitioned the Massachusetts General Court in January of 1773 with grievances against the Parliament of the United Kingdom. Two years later Timothy Foster was commissioned an ensign in the local militia. In July 1776, Foster was made a captain of the 7th Company in Colonel Joseph North's 2nd Lincoln County Regiment of the Massachusetts Militia  and, in the same year, Foster's company was at Fort Ticonderoga in New York. From 1778 Foster was a captain in William Lithgow's detachment, which in 1779 defended Lincoln County from British attack after the defeat of American naval forces in the Penobscot Expedition at Penobscot Bay.

Family

Timothy Foster married Sibboleth Freeman (1723–1813) on June 23, 1743, in Attleborough. Their children were Timothy Foster Jr., b. 1745; Bela (Billy) Foster, b. 1747; Eliphalet Foster b. 1749; Susan Foster, b. 1751; David Foster, b. 1753; Thomas Foster, b. 1755; Stuart Foster, b. 1757; John Foster, b. 1759; Oliver Foster, b. 1761; Sibler Foster, b. 1763; and Stephen Foster, b. 1766. All of their children were born in Attleborough except their last child, Stephen, who was the first child born to settlers in Winthrop. Eight of their sons served in the American Revolutionary War.

Death and legacy

Timothy Foster suffered a skull fracture and lost consciousness on April 1, 1785, after being hit by a tree limb. His son Stuart Foster and two neighbors walked to Falmouth, Maine, for a surgeon. The surgeon could not return with them, but he gave them a trephine—a saw to bore a hole in Foster's skull. Unfortunately, the men were unable to return in time to save him, and he passed away on April 3, 1785. According to one account they were able to briefly revive him: 
On the return of the son the indented part of the skull was raised, and Capt. Foster roused up and spoke rationally. But so long a time had elapsed, the inflammation had proceeded so far that he died. His remains were interred near where Dea. Metcalf lived.

His sons constructed a new house for their widowed mother, and it remains standing to this day. Outside her home the Daughters of the American Revolution placed a memorial plaque on a boulder on South Road near Birchwood Lane that honors Timothy Foster as a patriot and the first settler of Winthrop.

Notes

References

Citations

Bibliography

External links
 Commemorative plaque by Daughters of the American Revolution at ancestry.com
 Location of commemorative plaque on Google Maps
 About Winthrop, Maine at winthropmaine.org

1720 births
1783 deaths
People of colonial Massachusetts
People of colonial Maine
Patriots in the American Revolution
American pioneers